Stock 16 is a very young Galactic open cluster in the H II region RCW 75 (= Gum 48a). This region lies at the end of an "elephant trunk" shaped molecular cloud and may be a region with triggered star formation. The primary ionizing source for the H II region is the star HD 115455, with spectral type O7.5 III.

RCW 75 is also Gum 48a

In the 1985 paper The young open cluster Stock 16: an example of star formation in an elephant trunk? it was proposed the Stock 16 cluster was an example of star formation. The study included UBV photometry of over thirty stars in the cluster.

References

Open clusters
Centaurus (constellation)
Star-forming regions